Charles Ogle may refer to:

Charles Ogle (politician) (1798–1841), US Congressman
Sir Charles Ogle, 2nd Baronet (1775–1858), British admiral
Charles Stanton Ogle (1865–1940), American silent film actor
Charles Chaloner Ogle (1851–1871), British journalist
Charles Clifford Ogle (1923–1964), American businessman and aviator
Charles Ogle (racing driver) (1941–1985), American physician, businessman and NASCAR driver